Banza is a genus of conehead bush crickets found in Korea, Japan, and Pacific islands including Hawaii.

Species
Species include:
 Banza affinis (Perkins, 1899)
 Banza brunnea (Perkins, 1899)
 Banza crassipes Perkins, 1899
 Banza deplanata Brunner von Wattenwyl, 1895
 Banza kauaiensis (Perkins, 1899)
 Banza mauiensis Perkins, 1899
 Banza molokaiensis (Perkins, 1899)
 Banza nihoa Hebard, 1926
 Banza nitida (Brunner von Wattenwyl, 1895)
 Banza parvula (Walker, 1869)- type species (as Banza nigrifrons Walker, F.)
 Banza unica (Perkins, 1899)

References

External links

Tettigoniidae
Ensifera genera
Orthoptera of Asia